Louise du Pierry or Dupiery, née Elisabeth Louise Felicité Pourra de la Madeleine (30 July 1746 – 27 February 1807), was a French astronomer and professor.

Life
She was born in La Ferté-Bernard, in the French province of Maine, on 1 August 1746.

Louise du Pierry was a student, and also the mistress, of Jerome de Lalande in 1779. She studied both natural history and astronomy.

She was  member of the Académie des Sciences de Béziers.

In 1789, she became the first female professor at the Sorbonne university in Paris as the leader of the Cours d’astronomie ouvert pour les dames et mis à leur portée for female students. It was the first class geared towards women. The course was a huge success, despite many student fearing at first the subject matter would be too difficult for women.

She published many works involving the collection of astronomical data. These works include:

 Tables de l’effet des réfractions, en ascension droite et en déclinaison, pour la latitude de Paris, Paris, 1791. This publication concerned the estimation of the refraction effect, knowledge of which was necessary for the calculations of astronomers. The series of tables provide the amount of the refraction effect as a function of the right ascension and declination at the latitude of Paris.
 Tables de la durée du jour et de la nuit, Paris, 1792. This publication provided the duration of the days and the nights for both astronomical and civil uses. 
 Calculs d’éclipses pour mieux trouver le movement de la Lune.
 Table alphabétique et analytique des matières continues dans le cinq tomes du Système des connaissances chimiques de Fourcroy, Paris, Beaudouin, 1799 (year X of the French revolution).

Jerome De Lalande dedicated his work Astronomie des Dames (1790), to her, where she is lauded for her talent, taste, and courage in the field of science.

See also 
 Nicole-Reine Lepaute
 Timeline of women in science

References

External links 
  Chronology of women's history by Kirstin Olsen
 "Astronomes françaises du siècle des lumières à l'ère spatiale", calendar with short biographies (French)

18th-century French astronomers
1746 births
1807 deaths
19th-century French astronomers
Women astronomers
Academic staff of the University of Paris
18th-century French women scientists
19th-century French women scientists